Ofelya Karapeti Hambardzumyan (January 9, 1925 – June 13, 2016) was an Armenian folk singer.

Biography 
She was born in Yerevan, Armenia SSR on January 9, 1925. From a young age, she was recognized for her beautiful voice. She underwent vocal training at Romanos Melikyan Musical College.

Her repertoire included classical Armenian music, ashughakan music, and folk songs. She was especially recognized for her interpretations of ashugh Sayat-Nova's songs, such as "Յարէն էրուած իմ Yaren ervac im", "Յիս կանչում եմ լալանին Yis kanchum em lalanin", and others. She also performed the music of Fahrad, Jivani, Sheram.

Ofelya Hambardzumyan died on June 13, 2016 in Yerevan.

Awards
 People's Artist of Armenian SSR (1959)
 Mesrop Mashtots Medal for significant contribution to the art of Armenian song

References

External links

1925 births
2016 deaths
20th-century Armenian women singers
Musicians from Yerevan
People's Artists of Armenia
Recipients of the Order of the Red Banner of Labour
Armenian folk singers
Burials at the Komitas Pantheon